Eric Scoggins was a professional American football player who played linebacker for one season in the National Football League (NFL) for the San Francisco 49ers. Scoggins also played in the United States Football League (USFL) for the Los Angeles Express and Houston Gamblers.

He was diagnosed with ALS in January 2007 and died from the disease on January 9, 2009.

References

1959 births
2009 deaths
Players of American football from Inglewood, California
American football linebackers
USC Trojans football players
San Francisco 49ers players
Neurological disease deaths in the United States
Deaths from motor neuron disease